Akiyama (written:  lit. "autumn mountain") is a Japanese surname. Notable people with the surname include:

, general in the Imperial Japanese Army and considered father of the Japanese Cavalry
Denis Akiyama (1952–2018), Japanese-Canadian actor and voice actor
, Japanese printmaker
, Japanese professional Go player
, Japanese mathematician
, Japanese professional wrestler
, Japanese massage therapist, former crab fisherman, best known for being the first grand champion (1999) of the TV series Sasuke
, Japanese conductor
, Japanese baseball manager, former player
, Japanese astronomer
, Japanese volleyball player
, Japanese writer
, Imperial Japanese Navy admiral
, Japanese samurai
, Japanese actress, gravure idol and television personality
, Japanese Paralympic swimmer
, Japanese voice actress
, Japanese photographer
, Japanese female pop artist
, admiral of the Japanese Navy in the Russo-Japanese War, younger brother of Yoshifuru
, Japanese professional baseball player
, Japanese photographer
, Japanese literary critic
Tadashima Akiyama, 16th-century samurai known for being defeated by Miyamoto Musashi 
, Japanese photographer
, Japanese shōjo manga author and artist
, admiral of the Japanese Navy in World War II
, Japanese sport shooter
Tetuzi Akiyama, Japanese guitarist, violinist, and instrument-maker
, Japanese chef
, Japanese television journalist and cosmonaut
, Japanese sport wrestler
, judoka and mixed martial artist who has fought representing both South Korea and Japan
, Japanese archer
, Japanese engraving artist
, Japanese actress

Fictional characters
, a character in the manga series K-On!
, a character in the video game Hatsune Miku: Colorful Stage!
, a character in the television series Kamen Rider Ryuki
, a character in the anime series Digimon Tamers
, a character in the manga series Liar Game
Jan Akiyama|秋山 醤, lead character from the manga series Iron Wok Jan
Kaiichiro Akiyama (秋山 階一郎) and Baku Akiyama (秋山 爆), family members of the lead character from Iron Wok Jan
, a character in the anime series Girls und Panzer
, a character in the Yakuza (series)

See also
Akiyama clan, a Japanese clan mainly originating during the Sengoku Period of the 16th century

Japanese-language surnames